Madhuca sericea is a tree in the family Sapotaceae. The specific epithet sericea means "silky", referring to the indumentum.

Description
The bark is greyish brown. Inflorescences bear up to seven flowers.

Distribution and habitat
Madhuca sericea is native to Sumatra, Peninsular Malaysia, Singapore and Borneo. Its habitat is mixed dipterocarp forest to  altitude.

Conservation
Madhuca sericea has been assessed as vulnerable on the IUCN Red List. The species is threatened by logging and conversion of land for palm oil plantations.

References

sericea
Trees of Sumatra
Trees of Malaya
Trees of Borneo
Plants described in 1859